Bayandur is a village in the Akhuryan Municipality of the Shirak Province of Armenia. The Statistical Committee of Armenia reported its population was 690 in 2010, down from 711 at the 2001 census.

Demographics

References 

Communities in Shirak Province
Populated places in Shirak Province